The Bastyan Power Station is a conventional hydroelectric power station located in Western Tasmania, Australia.

Technical details
Part of the Pieman River scheme that comprises four hydroelectric power stations, the Bastyan Power Station is the third station in the scheme. The power station is located aboveground at the foot of the rock-filled concrete faced Bastyan Dam which forms Lake Rosebery. Water from the lake is fed to the power station near the centre of the dam wall by a  single penstock tunnel.

The station output, estimated to be  annually, is fed to TasNetworks' transmission grid via a 13.8 kV/220 kV Fuji generator transformer to the outdoor switchyard.

The water discharged from the Bastyan Power Station flows into Lake Pieman for use in the Reece Power Station.

See also 

 List of power stations in Tasmania

References

External links

Energy infrastructure completed in 1983
Hydroelectric power stations in Tasmania
Pieman River Power Development